MKS Pogoń 1945 Staszów is a Polish football club from Staszów. The club's greatest success are the 3rd place in the Third League (currently Second League) in the 2000–01 season, and the 2000–01 Polish Cup participation.

Previous names 
 KS Przyczółek Staszów (1945–53)
 KS Unia Staszów (1953-50/60s)
 KS Start Staszów (1950/60s–60s)
 KS Pogoń Staszów (1960s–2005)
 MKS Olimpia Pogoń Staszów (2005–06)
 MKS Pogoń 1945 Staszów (2006–current)

References 

Staszów County
Football clubs in Poland
Association football clubs established in 1945
1945 establishments in Poland
Football clubs in Świętokrzyskie Voivodeship